Here Comes Martin Corona (Spanish: Ahí viene Martín Corona) is a 1952 Mexican comedy western film directed by Miguel Zacarías and starring Pedro Infante, Sara Montiel and Eulalio González. It is also known by the alternative title of Little Love of My Life.

The film's sets were designed by the art director Luis Moya.

Cast
 Pedro Infante as Martín Corona  
 Sara Montiel as Rosario  
 Eulalio González as Piporro  
 Armando Silvestre as Emeterio  
 Florencio Castelló as Serafín Delgado  
 José Pulido as Diego  
 Ángel Infante as Lencho  
 José Alfredo Jiménez
 Antonio Bribiesca
 Julio Ahuet 
 Antonio Manuel Arjona 
 Guillermo Calles 
 Emilio Garibay 
 Blanca Marroquín 
 Miguel A. Peña 
 Armando Sáenz 
 José Torvay
 Armando Velasco 
 Acela Vidaurri

References

Bibliography 
 Rogelio Agrasánchez. Cine Mexicano: Posters from the Golden Age, 1936-1956. Chronicle Books, 2001.

External links 
 
 

1952 films
1950s Western (genre) comedy films
Mexican Western (genre) comedy films
1950s Spanish-language films
Films directed by Miguel Zacarías
1952 comedy films
Mexican black-and-white films
1950s Mexican films